Hydriomena renunciata, the renounced hydriomena, is a species of geometrid moth in the family Geometridae. It is found in North America.

The MONA or Hodges number for Hydriomena renunciata is 7236.

Subspecies
These four subspecies belong to the species Hydriomena renunciata:
 Hydriomena renunciata columbiata Taylor, 1906
 Hydriomena renunciata pernigrata Barnes & McDunnough, 1917
 Hydriomena renunciata renunciata
 Hydriomena renunciata viridescens McDunnough, 1954

References

Further reading

External links

 

Hydriomena
Articles created by Qbugbot
Moths described in 1862